Shikkari Shambhu is a 2018 Indian Malayalam-language comedy thriller film directed by Sugeeth and written by Nishad Koya. The film features Kunchacko Boban, Sshivada, Vishnu Unnikrishnan, Hareesh Kanaran and Alphy Panjikaran in lead roles. Produced and distributed by S. K. Lawrence through Angel Maria Cinemas.

Plot
The story revolves around three small-time fraudsters, Peelipose aka Peeli (Kunchacko Boban), Achu (Vishnu Unnikrishnan) and Shaji (Hareesh Kanaran). They overhear a conversation between a priest and his assistant and learn about a tiger unleashing terror in a village called Kurudimalakaavu and the region’s panchayat member(Manianpilla Raju) looking for a hunter.

Peeli and his friends were already in trouble where they were and sensing an opportunity, move to the village as hunters, eyeing the Rs 5 lakh reward as also the rare panchaloha idol in a temple. They become the darling of the villagers when they succeed in capturing the beast, though by a fortunate turn of events. Instead of bagging the cash prize, they request that they are allowed to stay in the village, obviously to pocket the idol that would make them rich. But there is another twist to the tale or is it better described as a tail? The unfolding events take the story forward.

Cast
 Kunchacko Boban as Peelipose (Peeli)
 Sshivada as Anitha
 Vishnu Unnikrishnan as Achu
 Hareesh Kanaran as Shaji
 Alphy Panjikaran as Revathi
 Aji John as Victor
 Jaise Jose as Satheesh
 Maniyanpilla Raju as Sahadevan
 Salim Kumar as SI Joseph Michael
 Sadiq as Joji
 Spadikam George as Mathews
 Johny Antony as Priest Babu
 Krishna Kumar as Retd. Forest Ranger Vasu
 R. K. Suresh as Anitha's Father
 Maya Menon as Anitha's Mother
 Pauly Valsan as Anitha's Mother-in-Law

Soundtrack
The film's music is by Sreejith Edayana.

 "Mazha"- Haricharan, Roshini Suresh
 "Kaana Chembaka Poo" - Vijay Yesudas
 "Tharam" - Deepak
 "Tharaarathara Moolana" - Vineeth Sreenivasan, Sreejith Edayana
 "Puliyunde Nariyunde" - Renjith Unni, Sreejith Edayana, Ramshi Ahamed

Release
The film was released on 20 January 2018 over 100 theaters in Kerala.

Critical response
Filmibeat rated the film 3.5 out of 5 stars saying that "If you are a fan of template-based entertainers, which will keep you entertained throughout with the right proportions of comedy, action, thrill, and suspense, then Shikkari Shambhu will definitely satisfy you completely". 
Sify.com reviewed the film to be "one time watch". While the comic sequences in the film were widely appreciated, while rated the film 3 out of 5 stars. Cinema Express, in its review, wrote "Shikkari Shambu is definitely a watchable film, the film has an unpredictable climax twist, one that comes as a real surprise.

References

External links
 

2018 films
Indian comedy films
Films set in forests
2010s Malayalam-language films
2018 comedy films
Films directed by Sugeeth